Jihad Sharif (born 26 July 1968) is a Jordanian wrestler. He competed in two events at the 1988 Summer Olympics.

References

External links
 

1968 births
Living people
Jordanian male sport wrestlers
Olympic wrestlers of Jordan
Wrestlers at the 1988 Summer Olympics
Place of birth missing (living people)